Tommaso Whitney (born May 8, 1985) is an American professional wrestler. He is currently signed to WWE, where he performs on the Raw brand under the ring name  Tommaso Ciampa.

Whitney began his career in 2005, working on several independent promotions. In 2011, he began to work with Ring of Honor until 2015. He later appeared on WWE in 2015 as part of the Dusty Rhodes Tag Team Classic, a tag team tournament. He formed a tag team, #DIY (Do It Yourself), with Johnny Gargano. The following year, he signed a contract with WWE and participated in the Cruiserweight Classic, a tournament for cruiserweight wrestlers, but Gargano defeated him in the first round.

Ciampa is a two-time NXT Champion and one-time NXT Tag Team Champion. Outside of WWE, he is best known for his work in Ring of Honor (ROH), where he is a one-time ROH World Television Champion. He has also wrestled for several other independent promotions, including Beyond Wrestling (BW), Chaotic Wrestling (CW), Top Rope Promotions (TRP), and Pro Wrestling Guerrilla (PWG).

Early life 
Tommaso Whitney was born on May 8, 1985 in Boston, Massachusetts. He is of Sicilian descent.

Professional wrestling career

Early career (2005–2007) 
Whitney was trained by WWE Hall of Famer Killer Kowalski, and debuted in January 2005. He predominantly wrestled for independent promotions located in Massachusetts, most notably Chaotic Wrestling and Top Rope Promotions.

On May 22, 2005, he wrestled an IWF Junior Heavyweight Championship match against champion Sean Royal, but was unsuccessful. Later that day he also failed to win a battle royal to earn the number one contendership to the IWF Heavyweight Championship.

Whitney debuted in Chaotic Wrestling as "Tommy Penmanship" in 2005. On April 1, he lost a qualifying match for entry in the Chaotic Wrestling Heavyweight Championship Tournament to Fred Sampson. In June, Penmanship teamed with Arch Kincaid to unsuccessfully challenge the Logan Brothers for the Chaotic Wrestling Tag Team Championship. Penmanship won his first championship on August 8, by defeating Chase del Monte for the Chaotic Wrestling New England Championship. He held it for half a year, successfully defending it against former del Monte, Jason Blade, and Psycho, before eventually losing it to Psycho at Cold Fury 5.

Penmanship then spent a couple of months without winning a singles match losing to Matt Logan and Psycho, but alongside Psycho, he won a Lethal Lottery Tournament first round match. Penmanship and Psycho qualified for a battle royal to determine the number one contender to the CW Heavyweight Championship, but the match was won by Luis Ortiz. At Breaking Point 2006 Penmanship lost to Psycho once again in a Psycho Rules match with Tommy Dreamer as the special referee. On May 19, Penmanship defeated Handsome Johnny and became Chaotic Wrestling Heavyweight Champion. As the Chaotic Heavyweight champion Penmanship defeated Bryan Logan, del Monte and Max Bauer. He held the Championship until February 2007, when he lost it to Brian Milonas in a "Loser leaves CW" match.

World Wrestling Entertainment (2005–2007) 
He appeared on the July 14, 2005, episode of SmackDown! as Thomas Whitney, ESQ one of Muhammad Hassan's lawyers and confronted The Undertaker. Tommaso read a statement from Hassan before being attacked by The Undertaker. On the December 17 episode of Velocity, under the ring name Demarso Whitney, he was defeated by Jamie Noble. On the August 25, 2006 episode of Heat he and Kofi Kingston had a dark match against Lance Cade and Trevor Murdoch.

On February 4, 2007, it was announced that Whitney signed a developmental contract with WWE and was sent to Ohio Valley Wrestling. He debuted on February 21 and wrestled as Tommaso. After suffering an injury, he was forced to step away from in ring competition and became known as Dr. Thomas, Anger Management Specialist – during which time he managed Bolin Services
(Charles Evans and Justin LaRouche), winning the OVW tag team titles. Dr Thomas would eventually make his in ring debut during a 6-man tag at Six Flags, tagging with Bolin Services to take on Elijah Burke and Cryme Tyme. On June 27, 2007, Whitney debuted a new gimmick when he began wrestling under a mask as Prodigy. On August 9, Whitney was released from his WWE developmental contract.

Independent circuit (2007–2016) 

In late 2007, he returned to the independent circuit. On September 29 Tommaso defeated A.J. Styles and Eddie Edwards to become the MWF Television Champion.

In September 2008 Ciampa debuted in Harley Race's World League Wrestling. In October he took part in Nine Man Battle Royal for the vacant WLW Heavyweight Championship, which was won by Go Shiozaki. Ciampa also unsuccessfully challenged WLW Tag Team Championship twice: on November 22, 2008 alongside Steve Anthony and on March 21, 2009 alongside Marc Godeker.

After returning to New England in 2008, Ciampa went on to compete in the ECWA Super 8 Tournament in 2009 and 2010 before finally winning the tournament in 2011 when he defeated Adam Cole.

On August 30, 2013, Ciampa made his debut for Pro Wrestling Guerrilla (PWG), when he entered the 2013 Battle of Los Angeles, losing to Brian Cage in his first round match.

Ring of Honor (2011–2015) 
At Honor Reclaims Boston he, Alex Payne and Ernie Osiris lost a dark match to Bobby Dempsey, Grizzly Redwood and Rhett Titus. Ciampa appeared in dark matches for Ring of Honor in both 2007 and 2009.

In January 2011, Ciampa began working regularly for ROH. On the January 22 Ring of Honor Wrestling tapings, he defeated Mike Sydal. He joined Prince Nana in his heel stable The Embassy. He later defeated Adam Cole and Grizzly Redwood. On April 1 he debuted on internet pay-per-view at Honor Takes Center Stage Night One, taking part in a Four Corners match that was won by Homicide. Ciampa went on to defeat Homicide twice, once on the second show of Honor Takes Center Stage and again on May 6, at ROH Revolution: USA. The next day, at ROH Revolution: Canada, Ciampa was part of the first "Double Danger Scramble" match, which was won by Michael Elgin. On July 13, Ring of Honor announced that Ciampa had signed a contract with the promotion. On September 17 at Death Before Dishonor IX, Ciampa pinned Homicide in a tag team match, where he teamed with Rhino and Homicide with Jay Lethal.

At an ROH house show on January 21, 2012, Ciampa defeated ROH World Television Champion Jay Lethal in a Proving Ground Match to earn a future match for the ROH World Television Championship. On March 4 at the 10th Anniversary Show, Ciampa's match with Lethal for the ROH World Television Championship ended in a fifteen-minute time limit draw. Ciampa continued his feud with Lethal on March 31 at Showdown in the Sun, where he interfered in his match with Roderick Strong and cost him the title. On the April 7 episode of Ring of Honor Wrestling, Ciampa defeated Lethal, Adam Cole and Mike Bennett in a four-way final to win the 2012 March Mayhem tournament. On May 12 at Border Wars, Ciampa's undefeated streak was ended, when he was defeated by Lethal in a singles match. On June 24 at Best in the World 2012: Hostage Crisis, Ciampa received another shot at the ROH World Television Championship, but was defeated by Roderick Strong in a three-way elimination match, also involving Lethal, following interference from Prince Nana. Afterward, Ciampa turned on Nana, after it was revealed that he had struck a deal with Truth Martini to keep the Television Championship on Strong, broke away from The Embassy and adopted R.D. Evans as his new manager. The feud between Ciampa and Lethal culminated on August 11 at Boiling Point, where Lethal defeated Ciampa in a Two Out of Three Falls match. During the match Ciampa tore his anterior cruciate ligament, sidelining him indefinitely from in-ring action. On September 7, Ciampa announced that his injury required surgery, which would sideline him for a year. Ciampa made an appearance on December 16 at Final Battle 2012: Doomsday, trying to get his hands on R.D. Evans, after he had defeated Prince Nana in a match. Ciampa returned from his injury on May 4 at Border Wars 2013, chasing Evans and his new associate, Q.T. Marshall, out of the ring.

On August 3, Ciampa entered a tournament to determine the new ROH World Champion, defeating Silas Young in his first round match. On August 17, Ciampa defeated Michael Bennett to advance to the semi-finals of the tournament. On September 20 at Death Before Dishonor XI, Ciampa was eliminated from the tournament by Adam Cole. At Final Battle 2013 on December 14, Ciampa began his first reign as ROH World Television Champion, when he defeated Matt Taven for the title. The following month Ciampa successfully defended the title against Taven and Jay Lethal in a three-way match. At the 12th Anniversary Show in February 2014, he retained the championship against Hanson. On April 4, at Supercard of Honor VIII, Ciampa lost the title to Jay Lethal following outside interference from Truth Martini.

After an extended period of absence, Ciampa returned on July 19 with a new look, having increased his muscle mass and sporting an untrimmed full beard. He promptly defeated Adam Page of The Decade, then followed it with a promo hinting at a heel turn stating that he felt under-appreciated and wanted a shot at the ROH World Championship before being interrupted by Silas Young. He followed this up on August 9 by losing to Rocky Romero by disqualification due to not releasing the Sicilian Stretch at the referee's count of five. After unsuccessfully challenging Michael Elgin for the ROH World Championship on August 23, Ciampa was (kayfabe) suspended indefinitely by ROH for attacking the ring crew and ring announcer Bobby Cruise, thus cementing his heel status.

At the ROH 13th Anniversary Show, Ciampa suffered two fractured ribs during his match, forcing him out of action. He later said he'd finished the match "on autopilot" as the pain was more intense than when he'd torn his ACL. He missed several Ring of Honor shows before returning to action (albeit with taped ribs) at an independent show in Toronto. On March 29, 2015, Ciampa announced his departure from ROH. His final match was a failed effort to win the TV title from Jay Lethal who retained after delivering a low blow to Ciampa. Ciampa then attacked referee Todd Sinclair with a low blow as payback for not calling a DQ for the illegal move.

Total Nonstop Action Wrestling (2015) 
Ciampa made an appearance for Total Nonstop Action Wrestling (TNA) on the September 30, 2015 episode of Impact Wrestling in a triple threat match also involving DJZ and Trevor Lee, which was won by Lee. Ciampa wrestled for TNA once again on the October 17, 2015, edition of Xplosion, defeating Crazzy Steve.

Return to WWE

#DIY (2015–2017) 

Although not re-signed to WWE, on September 2, 2015, Ciampa was announced as part of the NXT Dusty Rhodes Tag Team Classic tournament. On September 9, he successfully advanced in the first round of the tournament alongside his new partner Johnny Gargano, defeating the also newly formed duo of Tyler Breeze and Bull Dempsey. On the September 16 episode of NXT, Ciampa and Gargano lost to Baron Corbin and Rhyno thus eliminating them from the tournament. On the September 30 episode, Ciampa lost to Breeze in a singles match. He appeared on the December 2 episode of NXT, losing to Samoa Joe. Ciampa won a match against Danny Burch on the January 13, 2016, episode of NXT and defeated Bull Dempsey on the February 24, episode. On March 15 tapings, Ciampa scored another win, this time against Jesse Sorensen.

On April 2, it was confirmed that Ciampa had re-signed with WWE earlier in the week. Ciampa's NXT contract was a so-called "Tier 2" contract, which allowed him to continue working independent dates alongside his now regular NXT bookings. On June 23, Ciampa entered the Cruiserweight Classic tournament, losing to Johnny Gargano in his first round match. The following month, Ciampa announced that his final independent booking was set for September as he was entering a new exclusive NXT contract. On August 20 at NXT TakeOver: Brooklyn II, Ciampa and Gargano unsuccessfully challenged The Revival (Dash Wilder and Scott Dawson) for the NXT Tag Team Championship. Ciampa and Gargano, now collectively billed as "#DIY", received another title shot in a two out of three falls match on November 19 at NXT TakeOver: Toronto, where they defeated The Revival to become the new NXT Tag Team Champions.

DIY went on to successfully defend their championships against the team of Tajiri and Akira Tozawa and TM61 in Japan and Australia, respectively. They retained their titles against The Revival on the January 11, 2017 episode of NXT, but were attacked by The Authors of Pain (Akam and Rezar) afterwards. Ciampa and Gargano lost the championships to The Authors of Pain at NXT TakeOver: San Antonio. They would get their rematch on the March 1 episode of NXT, which ended in a no contest after The Revival interfered and attacked both teams. This led to NXT TakeOver: Orlando, a triple threat elimination match between all three teams for the titles, but DIY were unsuccessful after being the first team eliminated.

At NXT TakeOver: Chicago, DIY faced The Authors of Pain in the first-ever ladder match for the NXT Tag Team Championship, which they lost. After the match, Ciampa attacked Gargano, turning heel and disbanding #DIY. It was later revealed that Ciampa had suffered a ruptured ACL in his right knee during the ladder match and would await surgery in Birmingham, Alabama. In a further update, it was reported that his surgery was successful and the timetable for his return was estimated for early-to-mid 2018.

NXT Champion (2018–2022) 

On January 27, 2018, Ciampa returned at NXT TakeOver: Philadelphia, attacking Gargano with a crutch to close the show. He then cost Gargano his NXT Championship match against Andrade "Cien" Almas on the February 21 episode of NXT, forcing Gargano to leave NXT as per the pre-match stipulation. Ciampa made his in-ring return in the main event of NXT TakeOver: New Orleans, losing to Gargano in an unsanctioned match, resulting in Gargano being reinstated to NXT. Their feud would continue throughout the following weeks in which they attacked each other and interfered in each other's matches, leading to a Chicago Street Fight at NXT TakeOver: Chicago II, which Ciampa won.

On the July 18 tapings of the July 25 episode of NXT, Ciampa defeated Aleister Black to capture the NXT Championship after Gargano interfered and accidentally hit Black with the title belt. This made Ciampa only the second wrestler to hold both the NXT Championship and NXT Tag Team Championship, after Neville. At NXT TakeOver: Brooklyn IV, he was scheduled to defend the title against Black and Gargano in a triple threat match, but Black was removed from the match due to being ambushed in the arena parking lot by an unknown assailant (in reality, Black had suffered a legitimate groin injury). The match was changed to the first-ever Last Man Standing match for the NXT Championship between Ciampa and Gargano, where Ciampa retained his title. At NXT TakeOver: WarGames, Ciampa retained the championship against Velveteen Dream. Ciampa defended the title against Black at NXT TakeOver: Phoenix in a winning effort.

Ciampa debuted on Raw on February 18, 2019 with three other fellow NXT stars Johnny Gargano, Aleister Black and Ricochet. In his debut match on Raw, he and Gargano defeated former rivals Raw Tag Team Champions The Revival. The next night on SmackDown Live, Ciampa and Gargano defeated The Bar (Cesaro and Sheamus). On March 6, it was reported by Dave Meltzer of The Wrestling Observer that Ciampa would have to undergo neck surgery, as well as forcing him to vacate the NXT Championship and the injury would put him out of action for at least six months. At that point, he had not wrestled since February 19. WWE later confirmed the story saying he would undergo an anterior cervical fusion. Meltzer later reported that due to the injury, WWE had to cancel the main roster feud that was planned between Ciampa and Gargano. The two were also scheduled to face each other at NXT TakeOver: New York.

Ciampa relinquished his NXT Championship due to injury on the March 20, 2019 edition of NXT, ending his reign at 237 days. On April 1, he revealed that doctors had told him that he will be wrestling on "borrowed time" if he is even able to return to the ring at all. He made a surprise appearance at NXT TakeOver: New York on April 5 after Gargano defeated Adam Cole to win the NXT Championship, embracing Gargano to celebrate his victory and turning face in the process.

On the October 2 episode of NXT, Ciampa returned from injury, confronting Adam Cole, who had become the longest-reigning NXT Champion. After Ciampa saved Matt Riddle and Keith Lee from a beatdown at the hands of The Undisputed Era (Cole, Bobby Fish, Kyle O'Reilly, and Roderick Strong) on the October 30 episode of NXT, a WarGames match was scheduled between Ciampa's team against The Undisputed Era. At NXT TakeOver: WarGames on November 23, Team Ciampa (Ciampa, Lee, Dominik Dijakovic, and Kevin Owens) defeated The Undisputed Era. This led to a match between Ciampa and Cole at NXT TakeOver: Portland on February 16, 2020 for the NXT Championship, which Cole won after Gargano cost Ciampa the match, thus re-igniting their feud. On the April 8 episode of NXT, this culminated in a No Holds Barred match between Ciampa and Gargano, which Gargano won after interference from Candice LeRae.

Ciampa then entered a feud with Karrion Kross, who attacked him backstage during an interview. At TakeOver: In Your House, Ciampa was quickly defeated by Kross. After a brief hiatus, Ciampa returned as a heel on the August 26 episode of NXT, where he defeated Jake Atlas and continued his post-match assault on Atlas. He would then compete in a losing effort in the fatal four-way 60 minute Iron Man match for the vacant NXT Championship, tying with Gargano at one fall a piece. Ciampa turned face again when he began a feud with Timothy Thatcher, leading to a match at NXT TakeOver: WarGames where Ciampa won. On the January 20, 2021 episode of NXT, Ciampa fought and lost to Thatcher in the Fight Pit. After the match, Thatcher and Ciampa showed respect to one another and Ciampa asked Thatcher to be his partner for the Dusty Rhodes Tag Team Classic which Thatcher accepted. They defeated Ariya Daivari and Tony Nese in the first round and The Undisputed Era (Adam Cole and Roderick Strong) in the quarter finals, before losing to the Grizzled Young Veterans in the semi-finals. At NXT TakeOver: Stand & Deliver, Ciampa was defeated by Walter for the NXT UK Championship. On the June 15 episode of NXT, Ciampa and Thatcher defeated the Grizzled Young Veterans in a tornado tag match to earn a future NXT Tag Team Championship match. They faced the champions, MSK on July 6 at The Great American Bash but were defeated. Thatcher was written off TV on August 24 due to a kayfabe throat injury from Ridge Holland, ending the team; this was his final appearance as he was eventually released from the company in January.

On the September 14 episode of NXT, Ciampa defeated L. A. Knight, Pete Dunne, and Von Wagner in a fatal 4-way match to win the vacant NXT Championship. At Halloween Havoc, Ciampa retained against Bron Breakker. At WarGames, Ciampa teamed with Johnny Gargano, L. A. Knight and Pete Dunne (as "Team Black & Gold") against Breakker, Carmelo Hayes, Grayson Waller, and Tony D'Angelo (as "Team 2.0"), but lost when Breakker pinned Ciampa. At New Year's Evil on January 4, 2022, Ciampa lost the title to Breakker in a rematch, ending his second reign at 112 days. They both appeared on the March 7 episode of Raw, where they defeated Dolph Ziggler and Robert Roode. On April 2 at NXT Stand & Deliver, Ciampa lost to Tony D'Angelo in his final match in NXT.

Alliance with The Miz (2022–present) 
On the April 11 episode of Raw, Ciampa was officially called up to the brand while also participating in a backstage segment with Kevin Owens and Ezekiel. On the April 25 episode of Raw, now under the shortened ring name "Ciampa", he attacked Mustafa Ali after his match against The Miz, turning heel for the first time since 2019. On the July 4 episode of Raw, Ciampa aligned himself with The Miz after helping him attack AJ Styles after their match. On the August 1 episode of Raw, he defeated Dolph Ziggler and Chad Gable in a triple threat match while also defeating Styles later that night to earn an opportunity to face Bobby Lashley for the United States Championship. Ciampa faced Lashley for the title the following week in a match dedicated to Harley Race, but lost. On the September 5 episode of Raw, his ring name was reverted back to Tommaso Ciampa.

Other media 
As Tommaso Ciampa, he made his video game debut as a playable character in WWE 2K18 and has since appeared in WWE 2K20 , WWE 2K22 and WWE 2K23.

Personal life 
Whitney married former professional wrestler Jessie Ward in September 2013, having been introduced to her by their mutual friend Samoa Joe. They have one daughter together named Willow. Whitney held a part-time job managing a fitness studio until March 2014, when he left to focus on a full-time career in professional wrestling.

Championships and accomplishments 

CBS Sports
Feud of the Year (2018) vs. Johnny Gargano
Chaotic Wrestling
Chaotic Wrestling Heavyweight Championship (1 time)
Chaotic Wrestling New England Championship (1 time)
East Coast Wrestling Association
Super 8 Tournament (2011)
Millennium Wrestling Federation
MWF Television Championship (1 time)
Pro Wrestling Illustrated
Feud of the Year (2018) vs. Johnny Gargano
 Ranked No. 13 of the top 500 singles wrestlers in the PWI 500 in 2019
Ring of Honor
ROH World Television Championship (1 time)
March Mayhem Tournament (2012)
Sports Illustrated
Ranked No. 9 of the top 10 men's wrestlers in 2018  – tied with Johnny Gargano
UPW Pro Wrestling
UPW Heavyweight Championship (1 time)
 Wrestling Observer Newsletter
 Feud of the Year (2018) 
WWE
 NXT Championship (2 times)
NXT Tag Team Championship (1 time) – with Johnny Gargano
 NXT Year-End Award (3 times)
 Match of the Year (2016) 
 Male Competitor of the Year (2018)
 Rivalry of the Year (2018) 
Xtreme Wrestling Alliance
XWA Heavyweight Champion (1 time)

References

External links 

 
 Ring of Honor profile
 
 

1985 births
Living people
American male professional wrestlers
American professional wrestlers of Italian descent
NXT Champions
NXT Tag Team Champions
Professional wrestlers from Massachusetts
ROH World Television Champions
Sportspeople from Boston
21st-century professional wrestlers